Didenko is a Ukrainian surname. Notable people with the surname include:

Alexei Didenko (born 1983), Russian politician
Anatoliy Didenko (born 1982), Ukrainian footballer
Ihor Didenko (born 1967), Ukrainian politician
Nadiya Didenko (born 1986), Ukrainian freestyle skier
Torin Didenko (born 1987), footballer
Valeri Didenko (born 1946), Soviet canoeist
Vladyslav Didenko (born 1992), Ukrainian politician
Yulia Didenko (born 1978), Ukrainian politician

Ukrainian-language surnames